Red Circle Authors is a British publishing house based in London that specialises in Japanese fiction.

Origins 
Red Circle Authors was set up in 2016, by Richard Nathan and Koji Chikatani, to showcase Japan’s best creative writing. The Gutai group was the initial inspiration behind Red Circle Authors.

Members of the Red Circle Authors group include: Kazufumi Shiraishi, Fuminori Nakamura, Mitsuyo Kakuta, Takuji Ichikawa, Soji Shimada and Roger Pulvers.

Currently, only a limited number of literary works by Red Circle's authors are available outside Japan in translation. Despite this, many of Red Circle's authors have won literary awards in Japan including, for example, the Naoki Prize (Mitsuyo Kakuta 2005, Kazufumi Shiraishi in 2010) and the Akutagawa Prize (Fuminori Nakamura in 2005); and have had their works adapted for film and television in Japan.

Some of the group's authors already have well-established reputations in Asia (in China, Taiwan, Korea, and Thailand, for example) and are starting to win international literary prizes. Fuminori Nakamura, for instance, won the David L. Goodis Award in 2014.

Imprint and series 
Red Circle Authors' publishing imprint is Red Circle.

Red Circle Authors launched this imprint and publishing programme on 23 November 2018 with the launch of its first series Red Circle Minis and the publication of its first three Minis:

Stand-In Companion by Kazufumi Shiraishi, Backlight by Kanji Hanawa and Tokyo Performance by Roger Pulvers

Commentators and reviewers said after their publications that the approach taken was "not about resizing big books into small objects, but rather about celebrating textual brevity in book form itself", a longtime tradition in Japan.

Activities 
Red Circle Authors' activities are managed from London. The group also has an office in Tokyo. It promotes its select curated group of contemporary Japanese and Japan-based authors and their creative works to the international publishing industry and readers from these two locations.

In addition to its book publishing Red Circle publishes a magazine on its website, The Circle, which provides news, analysis and opinion on Japanese literature, writers, publishing, bookselling and culture.

References

External links 
Official website
The Circle
Red Circle Factbook

Book publishing companies based in London
Publishing companies established in 2016
British companies established in 2016
Japanese-language mass media
Japanese fiction
Literary translation